New North Road may refer to:

New North Road, Islington, a road in London
New North Road, New Zealand, a road in Auckland